Zelta Ābele is a Latvian publishing house. It was established in 1935.

References

Publishing companies established in 1935
Publishing companies of Latvia
1935 establishments in Latvia